Maurice Edgard Vieux (14 April 1884 in Savy-Berlette near Valenciennes – 28 April 1951 in Paris) was a French violist whose teaching at the Conservatoire de Paris plays a key role in the history of the viola in France.

Vieux received his 1st Prize Viola in 1902 in the class of Théophile Laforge, the first viola professor of the Conservatoire de Paris.  Thereafter, he was principal violist of the Opéra National de Paris (1907–1949) and the Orchestre de la Société des Concerts du Conservatoire, and member of the Quatuor Parent and Quatuor Touche.  In 1918, he replaced LaForge as professor of viola at the Conservatoire.

Vieux composed several works for the viola, notably his Vingt Études pour Alto (20 Études for Viola) published by Alphonse Leduc in 1927.

The Maurice Vieux International Viola Competition (Le Concours International d'Alto Maurice Vieux) was established in 1983 by the French viola society Les Amis de l'Alto.  The first-prize winner was the German violist Tabea Zimmermann.

In Memoriam and tribute given by two students of Maurice Vieux: Roger Delage, and André Jouvensal, 

Article published in the Bulletin n ° 16 in July 1951 du Conservatoire National de musique et d’Art Dramatique de Paris

It was in Savy-Berlette in the Pas de Calais France, in 1884 that Maurice Vieux was born. From a very young age, he started his musical studies under the direction of his father, first prize of violin of the National School of Music of Valenciennes. He then had MM. Leport and Laforge as teachers. Admitted to the Conservatoire de Paris, he obtained a first prize unanimously in 1902, following a competition which all the newspapers reported as being of exceptional quality. In 1907, he entered the Opera Orchestra, where he became soloist in 1908. He was to remain there until 1949. In addition, he was viola solo at the Society of Concerts of the Conservatory. In 1918, he succeeded to his teacher Laforge as a viola teacher at the Paris Conservatoire where he was a beloved and deeply admired Master. He formed a school of violists who belong to the great orchestras of both the old and the new worlds. Many of them are righteously famous. This year, he was to celebrate his 100th first prize.

A wonderfully gifted artist, an unparalleled virtuoso, he made of the viola a leading instrument, reducing the ostracism that kept it at a distance until then. Having been always considered the poor relation of the quartet, he made it a solo instrument. The musical literature for the viola, so limited until then, grew thanks to Maurice Vieux. Today, almost all composers write for this instrument and many of them have dedicated their work to Maurice Vieux.

Maurice Vieux played soloist at the Society of Concerts at the Conservatory, at Colonne, Pasdeloup, Walter Straram, and at the radio-symphonic orchestra. He made triumphal tours in Spain, Germany, Italy, England, Switzerland, Belgium. His merits have made him the sought-after and appreciated collaborator of such masters as Saint-Saëns, Gabriel Fauré, Vincent D'Indy and Claude Debussy; virtuosos such as Sarasate, Ysaye, Kreisler, Cortot, Marguerite Long, Enesco, Casals, Capet, Thibaud, Diemer, Sauer; Quartetists such as Marsick, Parent, Touche, Sechiari.

Maurice Vieux was decorated with the legion of honor in 1930. In 1931, His Majesty the King of the Belgians named him Knight of the order of Leopold. He has been an officer of Nichan-Iftikar since 1932.

His works are appreciated by violists around the world. They include two series of twenty studies, ten studies on orchestral traits and ten interval studies. A scherzo for viola and piano and a concert study also with piano. We owe him a transcription for Viola of the Cello Sonatas by J.S.Bach, he has collected and reviewed the viola concerts of Tartini and Hoffmeister. He has also published two pieces for violin and piano, an elegy and a lullaby.

Roger Delage 1st prize in 1949 

On March 1, 1951, Maurice Vieux played for the last time in public. The artists Nazly of Staecklin, André Proffit, Jacques Dejean and André Navarra who, with him, played the Quartet in C minor and the second quintet of Fauré, told us what they owed to the calm mastery of the violist who simply supported them, allowing them to be fully dedicated to the work at hand. However, the one to whom our warmest applause went gave us some worry. Obviously, his coat was now too ample for him, his complexion had no longer the freshness we had known, he walked slowly, carefully, his breath was short. He was sick, seriously ill. We knew it, and so did he. How could he have ignored it when doctors surrounded him, and he could not fail to see his strength, which had been so great, declining?

However, we scarcely dared to speak to him of his health, for his extraordinary courage was there, denying his illness. He disregarded the ordinances of the doctors who recommended he rests. We saw him work hard until the day before his death. This trait of stoicism shines a light on this singular man.

How not to be sad when you know that, about three years ago, Maurice Vieux was preparing to focus more on his career as a soloist. It was then that this heart disease of which he was to die from was declared, forbidding him to carry out his project. How not to be sad that there is no phonographic recordings of one of the perfect virtuosos of this century ...

It has been unanimously said that: "his tried and tested style, his accomplished technique, his ample and generous sound, his natural sense of expression and the strongest musicality. What delighted me when watching my master was that extraordinary suppleness we see in great sportsmen, great dancers, and famous acrobats. The viola in hand, Vieux was laid back, the dangerous traits seemed easy, effortless. I want to recall here a little fact that is seemingly irrelevant, but which, however, enlightened me on his agility. We had lunch and the table was cluttered with dishes and crystals. He wanted to take a drink from a guest to pour some wine. Seeing this apparently soft hand, like a cat's paw, I feared it was going to knock over some object while grabbing the crystal. Plump, broad, with ragged fingers, his hand had the delicacy of a gardener’s hand, and did not show the tapered, slender aspect that is almost always wrongly attributed to the "artist's hands."

When, for the first time, I met M. Vieux, I did not feel that sudden sympathy which sometimes unites us, at first, with certain human beings. It took me some time - and my friendship became even more vivid - to override that slightly grumpy mood and discover behind this imposing and rough carapace who he really was: a teacher devoted to his pupils, a delicate man without affectation, a great kindness. The sycophancy was not his forte, he did not belong to that kind of pedagogue who, with the pupil, is gentle, benevolent, conciliatory, paternal; nor was it cold and easily sarcastic, which looks down upon and paralyses the superiority with which they are entrusted to those entrusted to them. We knew he was sincere and uncompromising. And it is, I believe, this intransigence that we find throughout his artistic career. This maxim of Plautus, he could have made it his own: "It is by merit and not by favor that we must seek to advance".

André Jouvensal 1st prize in 1922 

For years, we have been anxiously admiring the fierce fight against death, his passionate refusal to abandon his pupils to whom, for more than thirty-three years, he gave the best of himself. Alas! the evil ended up triumphing and did not allow him this expected joy: to celebrate these next few days his hundredth first prize, which he expected with a legitimate pride and which will express better than any eulogy the loss suffered by our Conservatoire and by the French music.

It is only natural that a teacher worthy of this beautiful but difficult profession should be surrounded by the exclusive and affectionate admiration of his pupils. It is also a beautiful tradition that, on a tomb still fresh, envy and ingratitude keep silent, and be deposited only praises, more or less hyperbolic. The task of whoever wants to draw a true, deeply sincere portrait of a disappeared man is made difficult. In doubt, it suffices to allow one's heart to speak and to simply say what one knows; age and experience having taught us to judge the expression of our feelings.

Those who have not heard him can not imagine the male sonority combined with a nobility of style of a rare dignity he had. His charm without concession to facility, his astounding technique, always ready and always at ease, his sovereign authority in the playing style as well in the attitude, as far from the morgue as the false modesty; in short, these qualities so diverse, united in such right proportions, made him an inevitable choice among all the virtuosos of all countries for the ensembles of Enesco, Kreisler, Cortot, Thibaud, Casals, Francescatti, or Saint-Saens, Debussy, d'Indy and so many others.

A career of international virtuosity? It was up to him, and I remember the short hesitation when, in 1919, the Minister wanted to send him for an important series of concerts in the United States, when such impresario solicited him for the Germany, Italy, Central Europe: "What would become of my students? "

The mastery of his teaching, his ardor and his meticulousness were as lively as ever in the evening of an exhausting day for anyone else: after the seventh hour of lesson, the final chord of a Valkyrie or a Rose Knight found him as valiant, as triumphant as he had been at the beginning of a sparkling recital. And how many of us owe him an emotional memory for some help, or a favour sometimes hidden by a charming modesty; his table was open to those who were going through a difficult time, his complete hospitality offered to others who were ill in some modest hotel room; we can not count his efforts in order to provide jobs and support, to fix an injustice, to palliate a misfortune. If they were less spectacular, the services rendered to the French Music by such a master were, we believe, more effective and more durable than many glorious recitals.

When this modest tribute will be read, the Conservatoire de Paris will have awarded the first Premiere Viola of Maurice Vieux's class a cast of this powerful hand, the frightful agility of which we considered with timid respect. His bust was erected in this little room, where his indignant voice still echoes from some technical mistake, or his laughter blooming before a difficulty overcome with elegance. And then Maurice Vieux will still live in the heart of so many beings who owe him such beautiful artistic joys, so many young people who owe to him the little they know. If it is true that the dying are reviewing their existence, Maurice Vieux left comforted by noting that his sowing has risen well: a pleiad of artists follow his trace, strive to resemble him. But all remain dismayed, knowing how much he remains irreplaceable.

Compositions 
 20 Études for viola solo (1927); Éditions Alphonse Leduc
 10 Études sur des traits d'orchestre (1928); Éditions Alphonse Leduc
 Scherzo for viola and piano (1928); Éditions Alphonse Leduc
 6 Études de concert for viola and piano (1928–1932); Éditions Alphonse Leduc; Éditions Max Eschig; Associated Music Publishers
 10 Études sur les intervalles for viola solo (1931); Éditions Alphonse Leduc

Dedications 
 Max Bruch – Romanze for viola and orchestra, Op. 85 (1911)
 Henri Büsser – Catalane sur des airs populaires for viola and orchestra or piano, Op. 78 (1926)
 Henri Büsser – Rhapsodie arménienne sur des thèmes populaire in B minor for viola and piano, Op. 81 (1930)
 Gabriel Grovlez – Romance, Scherzo et Finale for viola and piano (1932)
 Reynaldo Hahn – Soliloque et forlane for viola and piano (1937)
 Désiré-Émile Inghelbrecht – Impromptu in F minor for viola and piano (1922)
 Joseph Jongen – Allegro appassionato for viola and piano or orchestra, Op. 79 (1925)
 Joseph Jongen – Introduction et danse for viola and piano or orchestra, Op. 102 (1935)
 J. M. L. Maugüé – Allègre, lent et scherzo for viola and orchestra (1927)
 Paul Rougnon – Fantaisie-Caprice in G major for viola and piano (1922)

1884 births
1951 deaths
People from Nord (French department)
French classical violists
20th-century French composers
French male composers
Academic staff of the Conservatoire de Paris
Conservatoire de Paris alumni
20th-century French male musicians
20th-century violists